Shaun Lane (born 29 November 1994) is an Australian professional rugby league footballer who plays as  forward for the Parramatta Eels in the NRL. 

He previously played for the Canterbury-Bankstown Bulldogs, New Zealand Warriors and the Manly-Warringah Sea Eagles in the National Rugby League.

Background
Lane was born in Sydney, New South Wales, Australia. He is the younger brother of former Bulldogs player Brett Lane.

Lane played his junior rugby league for the South Eastern Seagulls, before being signed by the Canterbury-Bankstown Bulldogs.

Playing career

Early career
In 2013 and 2014, Lane played for the Canterbury-Bankstown Bulldogs' NYC team.

2015
In 2015, Lane graduated to the Bulldogs' New South Wales Cup team. In Round 14, he made his NRL debut for Canterbury against the Gold Coast Titans. On 27 September, he was named on the interchange bench in the 2015 New South Wales Cup Team of the Year. He was named the club’s rookie of the year, winning the Steve Mortimer Medal.

2016
On 5 April, Lane was released by Canterbury in exchange for Raymond Faitala-Mariner. 

He signed a one year deal with the New Zealand Warriors. He made his sole appearance for the Warriors in round 9 against the St. George Illawarra Dragons. In August, he signed a 2-year contract with the Manly Warringah Sea Eagles starting in 2017.

2018
Lane had a good year for the Sea Eagles, finishing the year as their top try scorer. In the middle of the season, he signed with the Parramatta Eels.

2019
Lane made his debut for Parramatta in Round 1 against Penrith which ended in a 20-12 victory.  The following week, Lane scored his first try for the club in Parramatta's 36-16 victory over Canterbury.  In Round 6, Lane scored his second try for the club as Parramatta defeated Wests Tigers 51-6 in the opening match at the new Western Sydney Stadium.

At the end of the 2019 regular season, Parramatta finished in 5th place on the table and qualified for the finals.  In the elimination final against Brisbane, Lane scored a try as Parramatta won the match 58-0 at the new Western Sydney Stadium.  The victory was the biggest finals win in history, eclipsing Newtown's 55-7 win over St George in 1944.  The match was also Parramatta's biggest win over Brisbane and Brisbane's worst ever loss since entering the competition in 1988.

2020
On 3 March, Lane signed a new three-year deal worth $1.3 million to see him stay at Parramatta until the end of the 2023 season.

2021
Lane played almost every match for Parramatta in the 2021 NRL season including both finals matches.  Parramatta were eliminated from the semi-final stage of the competition by Penrith in a tough 8-6 defeat.

Drug prank
On 12 August 2019, it was revealed that Lane was under investigation by the NRL integrity unit after photos were shown Lane holding a plastic bag with a white substance inside.  The photos were alleged to have been taken during Manly's 2018 mad monday celebrations.

On 19 August 2019, Lane spoke to the media saying that he felt like an idiot after the photos of him with a plastic bag containing a white substance were leaked.  Lane said that it was a prank gone wrong and explained further by saying “I have made the game look very bad and brought it into disrepute, so on that basis, I was accepting of my punishment".  Lane was fined $17,500 over the incident.

2022
Lane played 26 games for Parramatta in the 2022 NRL season including their Grand Final loss to Penrith.
On 5 October 2022, Lane was awarded with the Ken Thornett Medal as Parramatta's player of the year.
On 7 October, Lane signed a three-year contract extension to remain at Parramatta until the end of 2026.

2023
On 20 February, it was announced that Lane would be ruled out for an indefinite period after suffering a fractured jaw in Parramatta's trial victory over Newcastle.

References

External links

Parramatta Eels profile
Manly Sea Eagles profile
New Zealand Warriors profile

1994 births
Living people
Australian rugby league players
Canterbury-Bankstown Bulldogs players
New Zealand Warriors players
Manly Warringah Sea Eagles players
Parramatta Eels players
Rugby league second-rows
Rugby league players from Sydney